Bojan Radulović (born 31 March 1992) is a Slovenian-Serbian professional basketball player who last played for Koper Primorska of the Slovenian League. He is a 2.11 m tall center.

Playing career 
Radulović is a center who started playing basketball with his hometown's club Spartak before moving to Slovenian Elektra Šoštanj and spending further five years playing for Union Olimpija, Geoplin Slovan, and Helios Domžale.

Radulović returned to Serbia by signing for Metalac Farmakom in September 2014, but his contract was terminated in March 2015, a few days before the final round of the 2014–15 ABA League season.

In September 2015, Radulović signed with the Slovenian First Division club KK Škofja Loka.

References

External links
 Profile at abaliga.com
 Profile at eurobasket.com
 Profile at fiba.com

1992 births
Living people
ABA League players
Basketball League of Serbia players
KK Olimpija players
KK Metalac Valjevo players
Serbian expatriate basketball people in Slovenia
Serbian expatriate basketball people in North Macedonia
Serbian men's basketball players
Slovenian men's basketball players
Slovenian people of Serbian descent
Centers (basketball)
Helios Suns players